The 4th Infantry Division Gemina is one of the major units of the Romanian Land Forces, with its headquarters in Cluj-Napoca. Until 15 June 2008 it was designated as the 4th Territorial Army Corps "Mareșal Constantin Prezan" (Corpul 4 Armată Territorial "Mareșal Constantin Prezan").

Structure 2020 

 4th Infantry Division "Gemina", in Cluj-Napoca
 15th Mechanized Brigade "Podu Înalt", in Iași
 18th Infantry Brigade "Banat", in Timișoara
 61st Mountain Hunters Brigade "Virgil Bădulescu", in Miercurea Ciuc
 81st Mechanized Brigade "General Grigore Bălan", in Bistrița
 50th Anti-aircraft Missile Regiment "Andrei Mureșianu", in Florești
 69th Mixed Artillery Regiment "Silvania", in Șimleu Silvaniei
 317th Intelligence, Surveillance and Reconnaissance (ISR) Regiment "Vlădeasa", in Cluj-Napoca

References

External links
Website dedicated to the Romanian Army in World War II
 Official site of the 4th Division 

4th
Romania
Military units and formations of Romania in World War II